Bastianiidae is a family of nematodes belonging to the order Araeolaimida.

Genera:
 Bastiania de Man, 1876
 Dintheria de Man, 1921

References

Nematodes